Melvin M. Ragin (December 8, 1950 – October 24, 2018), known professionally as "Wah Wah Watson", was an American guitarist who was a member of The Funk Brothers, the studio band for Motown Records.

Career
A native of Richmond, Virginia, Melvin Ragin moved to Detroit and became a member of the Motown Records studio band The Funk Brothers, where he recorded with artists like The Temptations (his guitar work on "Papa Was a Rollin' Stone" is particularly notable), The Jackson 5, the Four Tops, Gladys Knight & the Pips, and The Supremes.  He played on numerous sessions in the 1970s and 1980s for many top soul, funk and disco acts, including Herbie Hancock; he both recorded and composed songs with the Pointer Sisters.

In 1977, Watson released his first solo album, Elementary, on Columbia Records.  The album was co-produced by Watson and David Rubinson.

In 1994, Watson appeared on the Red Hot Organization's compilation album, Stolen Moments: Red Hot + Cool.  The album, meant to raise awareness and funds in support of the AIDS epidemic in relation to the African American community, was heralded as "Album of the Year" by Time magazine.

In the 2000s, Watson appeared on the albums Maxwell's Now (2001), Black Diamond (2000) by Angie Stone, the soundtrack to the film Shaft (2000), Damita Jo (2004) by Janet Jackson, Alicia Keys' Unplugged (2005), and The Element of Freedom (2009).

Death
Watson died on October 24, 2018, at St. John's Hospital in Santa Monica.

Discography

As leader
 Elementary (1976)

As sideman
With Herbie Hancock
 Man-Child (1975)
 Secrets (1976)
 VSOP (1977)
 Feets, Don't Fail Me Now (1979)
 Monster (1980)
 Mr. Hands (1980)
 Dis Is Da Drum (1994)

With others
 The Beach Boys, L.A. (Light Album) (1979)
 George Benson, Love Remembers (1993)
 George Benson, Songs and Stories (2009)
 Yung Berg, Look What You Made Me (2008)
 Blondie, Autoamerican (1980)
 Donald Byrd, Thank You...For F.U.M.L. (Funking Up My Life) (Elektra, 1978)
 Cher, Take Me Home (1979)
 Four Tops, Nature Planned It (1972)
 Marvin Gaye, Let's Get It On (1973)
 Gloria Gaynor, "I Will Survive" (1978)
 Dizzy Gillespie, Free Ride (1977)
 John Lee Hooker, Free Beer and Chicken (1974)
 Thelma Houston, Ride to the Rainbow (1979)
 Bobbi Humphrey, Satin Doll (1974)
 Janet Jackson, Damita Jo (2004)
 Michael Jackson, Off the Wall (1979)
 Michael Jackson Bad (1987)
 The Jackson 5, ABC (1970)
 Quincy Jones, Body Heat (1974)
 Quincy Jones, Q's Jook Joint (1995)
 Illya Kuryaki and the Valderramas, Versus (1997)
 Labelle, Chameleon (1976)
 Maysa Leak, Out of the Blue (2002)
 Love Unlimited, Under the Influence of... (1973)
 The Love Unlimited Orchestra, Rhapsody in White (1974)
 Maxwell, Maxwell's Urban Hang Suite (1994)
 Maxwell, Now (2001)
 Brian McKnight, Brian McKnight (1992)
 Brian McKnight, I Remember You (1995)
 Meshell Ndegeocello, Plantation Lullabies (1993)
 Meshell Ndegeocello, Peace Beyond Passion (1996)
 Pointer Sisters, Steppin' (1975)
 Martha Reeves, Martha Reeves (1974)
 Rose Royce, Car Wash (1976)
 Boz Scaggs, Slow Dancer (1974)
 The Temptations, All Directions (1972)
 The Temptations, Masterpiece (1973)
 Tyrese, Black Rose (2015)
 The Undisputed Truth, The Undisputed Truth (1971)
 Vanessa L. Williams The Comfort Zone (1991)
 Stevie Wonder, Conversation Peace (1995)

References

External links
 
 
 

1950 births
2018 deaths
20th-century American guitarists
20th-century American male musicians
African-American guitarists
American funk guitarists
American male guitarists
American rhythm and blues guitarists
American session musicians
American soul guitarists
Guitarists from Virginia
Jazz musicians from Virginia
Musicians from Richmond, Virginia
The Funk Brothers members
The Headhunters members
20th-century African-American musicians
21st-century African-American people
The Love Unlimited Orchestra members